Aglaia Mortcheva (born 1972) is a Bulgarian former animator and illustrator, currently a voice actress, perhaps best known for her portrayal of Vendetta on the Making Fiends web series and on the television series. Mortcheva is also a professor of art and animation at California State University, Northridge.

Biography
Mortcheva was born and raised in Sofia, Bulgaria. At age six, she started working as a child actress and later became an artist at age fourteen. At age twenty six, she moved to Los Angeles, California, where she also currently lives with her husband. They have two children born in 1998 and 2002. 

She worked on shows such as South Park. In 2003, Mortcheva was the voice of Vendetta on Amy Winfrey's web project, Making Fiends. The series was televised in 2008, in which Mortcheva was a character designer. In 2009, Mortcheva published a short film titled When I am Sad, which she wrote, animated, and provided the voice for the main character.

Her first art book, Aglaia Mortcheva: Drawings and Illustrations: Volume 1, was released on August 30, 2009.

Filmography

References

External links
Official blog
Official website

Living people
Bulgarian animators
Bulgarian film actresses
Actresses from Sofia
1972 births
Bulgarian emigrants to the United States